Camptacra is a genus of flowering plants in the family Asteraceae.

 Species
 Camptacra barbata N.T.Burb.	 - New South Wales, Queensland
 Camptacra brachycomoides (F.Muell.) N.T.Burb.	 - Northern Territory 
 Camptacra gracilis (Benth.) Lander - Northern Territory, Queensland, Western Australia, New Guinea

References

Asteraceae genera
Astereae